

Karl Lorenz (24 January 1904  – 3 October 1964) was a German general during World War II who commanded the Panzer Division Grossdeutschland. He was a recipient of the  Knight's Cross of the Iron Cross with Oak Leaves of Nazi Germany.

Awards and decorations
 Iron Cross (1939) 2nd Class (23 September 1939) & 1st Class (24 June 1940)
 German Cross in Gold on 2 January 1942 as Major in Pionier-Battalion 290
 Knight's Cross of the Iron Cross with Oak Leaves
 Knight's Cross on 17 December 1942 as Major and commander of Pionier-Battalion "Großdeutschland"
 Oak Leaves on 12 February 1944 as Oberst and commander of Grenadier-Regiment "Großdeutschland"

References

Citations

Bibliography

 
 
 

1904 births
1964 deaths
People from Hanau
People from Hesse-Nassau
Major generals of the German Army (Wehrmacht)
Recipients of the Gold German Cross
Recipients of the Knight's Cross of the Iron Cross with Oak Leaves
German prisoners of war in World War II held by the United States
Military personnel from Hesse